This is a list of things named after the German mathematician Karl Weierstrass.

Mathematical concepts, theorems, and the like

Named after Weierstrass and other persons

Named after Weierstrass alone

Typography 
 Weierstrass p, a form of the letter p used to denote the Weierstrass elliptic function

Celestial bodies or features of them 
 Weierstrass (crater)
 14100 Weierstrass

Research institutes 
 Weierstrass Institute for Applied Analysis and Stochastics in Berlin, Germany

Weierstrass, Karl